Cophes is a genus of hidden snout weevils in the family of beetles known as Curculionidae. There are about eight described species in Cophes.

Species
These eight species belong to the genus Cophes:
 Cophes armipes (Boheman, 1837) g
 Cophes basalis (Chevrolat, 1880) g
 Cophes fallax (LeConte, 1876) i c b
 Cophes grisescens (Chevrolat, 1880) g
 Cophes longiusculus (Boheman, 1837) i c b
 Cophes oblongus (LeConte, 1876) i c b
 Cophes obtentus (Herbst, 1797) i c g b
 Cophes texanus Sleeper, 1955 i b
Data sources: i = ITIS, c = Catalogue of Life, g = GBIF, b = Bugguide.net

References

Further reading

 
 
 

Cryptorhynchinae
Articles created by Qbugbot